Kojak: The Price of Justice is a 1987 made-for-television film based on the 1973–1978 TV series Kojak, starring Telly Savalas as Theo Kojak.

Plot
Kojak is on a new case, the bodies of two young boys are found in the Harlem river. Their mother (Kate Nelligan) is the main obvious suspect, particularly with her scandalous past, but Kojak believes that she is innocent. Soon afterward the boys' father (Pat Hingle) kills himself. Kojak and his new assistant (John Bedford Lloyd) have to sort things out and solve the case which isn't going to be as straightforward a task as it seems.

Cast and characters
 Kate Nelligan as Kitty
 Pat Hingle as George
 Jack Thompson as Aubrey Dubose
 Brian Murray as District Attorney Neary
 John Bedford Lloyd as Bass
 Jeffrey DeMunn as Marsucci
 Tony DiBenedetto as Detective Catalano
Ron Frazier as J.T. Williams
Stephen Joyce as Chief Brisco
Earl Hindman as Danny
James Rebhorn as Quibro
Martin Shakar as Arnold Nadler
Joseph Carberry as Lorenzo
Fausto Bara as Benjamin

References

External links
 

1987 television films
1987 films
Television series reunion films
Films based on television series
Kojak
CBS network films
Television films based on television series
Films directed by Alan Metzger
1980s English-language films